Grandes is compilation album released by Latin American Mexican rock band Maná. They released this greatest hits album for distribution in Italy.

Track listing

 En el muelle de San Blas - 5:34
 Vivir Sin Aire - 4:54
 Oye Mi Amor - 4:36
 Te Lloré Un Río - 4:55
 Como Te Deseo - 4:34
 Clavado En Un Bar - 5:15
 No Ha Parado de Llover - 5:26
 Déjame Entrar - 4:26
 Cuando los Ángeles Lloran - 5:08
 De Pies a Cabeza - 4:40
 Perdido En Un Barco - 4:16
 Rayando el Sol - 4:16
 Hechicera - 5:05
 Un Lobo Por Tu Amor - 5:24
 Corazón Espinado - 4:38

Certifications

References

2001 albums